Monica Elizabeth "Mona" Freeman (June 9, 1926 – May 23, 2014) was an American actress and painter.

Early years
Freeman was born in Baltimore, Maryland, and grew up in Pelham, New York. A lumberman's daughter, she was a model while in high school, and was selected the first "Miss Subways" of the New York City transit system in 1940.

Career
Paramount Pictures signed Freeman to a contract after she moved to Hollywood. She eventually signed a movie contract with Howard Hughes.

Her contract was later sold to Paramount Pictures. Her first film appearance was in the 1944 film Till We Meet Again. She became a popular teenage movie star. After a series of roles as a pretty, naive teenager, she complained of being typecast.

As an adult, Freeman's career slowed and she appeared in mostly B-movies, though an exception was her role in the film noir Angel Face (1952). She also co-starred in the hit film Jumping Jacks with the comedy team of Dean Martin and Jerry Lewis.

Freeman's appearances in films ended in the 1950s, but she continued to work in television. Among her appearances were seven guest roles on The United States Steel Hour from 1960 to 1962 and three on Perry Mason, all of them roles as Mason's client: Jane Wardman in "The Case of the Lurid Letter" (1962), Rosanne Ambrose in "The Case of the Illicit Illusion" (1964), and Ellen Payne in "The Case of the 12th Wildcat" (1965). She appeared in two episodes of Wanted: Dead or Alive starring Steve McQueen titled "The Fourth Headstone" (Season One, Episode 9, air date 11/1/1958) and "Breakout" (Season 2 Episode 4, aired 9/26/1959), and two episodes of Maverick titled "The Cats of Paradise" (1959) and "Cruise of the Cynthia B." (1960), both starring James Garner, in which she played a recurring role as crazy-eyed swindler Modesty Blaine. She also appeared in an episode of Riverboat titled "The Boy from Pittsburgh" (1959) starring Darren McGavin and Burt Reynolds, an episode of Checkmate titled "Don't Believe a Word She Says" (1961) starring Doug McClure and Sebastian Cabot, and an episode of The Tall Man titled "Petticoat Crusade" (1961) starring Barry Sullivan as Pat Garrett and Clu Gulager as Billy the Kid, along with numerous other leading lady roles in various television series, including anthologies.

Freeman was a portrait painter and concentrated on painting after 1961. Her best-known portrait is that of businesswoman Mary See, founder of See's Candies.

Personal life and death
Freeman married Pat Nerney, a car dealer, in Los Angeles in 1945. The couple had one daughter, Mona. They divorced in 1952. In 1961, she married H. Jack Ellis, a businessman from Los Angeles.

Freeman died on May 23, 2014, at the age of 87 after a long illness, at her Beverly Hills home.

Partial filmography

 Till We Meet Again (1944) - Elise
 National Velvet (1944) - Schoolgirl (uncredited)
 Here Come the Waves (1944) - Fainting Girl (uncredited)
 Together Again (1944) - Diana Crandall
 Roughly Speaking (1945) - Barbara, ages 15–20
 Junior Miss (1945) - Lois Graves
 Danger Signal (1945) - Anne Fenchurch
 Our Hearts Were Growing Up (1946) - Girl (uncredited)
 Black Beauty (1946) - Anne Wendon
 That Brennan Girl (1946) - Ziggy Brennan
 Dear Ruth (1947) - Miriam Wilkins
 Mother Wore Tights (1947) - Iris
 Variety Girl (1947) - Mona Freeman
 Isn't It Romantic? (1948) - Susie Cameron
 Streets of Laredo (1949) - Rannie Carter
 The Heiress (1949) - Marian Almond
 Dear Wife (1949) - Miriam Wilkins
 I Was a Shoplifter (1950) - Faye Burton
 Copper Canyon (1950) - Caroline Desmond
 Branded (1950) - Ruth Lavery
 Dear Brat (1951) - Miriam Wilkins
 Darling, How Could You! (1951) - Amy
 The Greatest Show on Earth (1952) - Spectator (uncredited)
 Flesh and Fury (1952) - Ann Hollis
 Jumping Jacks (1952) - Betsy Carter
 Thunderbirds (1952) - Lt. Ellen Henderson
 Angel Face (1953) - Mary Wilton
 Battle Cry (1955) - Kathy - later Mrs. Danny Forrester
 Before I Wake (1955) - April Haddon
 The Road to Denver (1955) - Elizabeth Sutton
 Dial 999 (1955) - Terry Moffat Carradine
 Huk! (1956) - Cindy Rogers
 Hold Back the Night (1956) - Anne Franklin McKenzie
 Dragoon Wells Massacre (1957) - Ann Bradley
 The World Was His Jury (1958) - Robin Carson

Partial television credits

 Wanted: Dead or Alive (2 episodes)
 "The Fourth Headstone" (1958) - Jackie Harris
 "Breakout" (1959) - Margaret Dunn
 Wagon Train
 "The Monty Britton Story" (1958) - Betty Britton
 The Red Skelton Hour (2 episodes)
 "San Fernando's Singing Sensation" (1958) - Guest
 "Freddie Gets a Job" (1959) - Kathy
 Pursuit
  "Calculated Risk" (1958) - Nina Hodges
 Playhouse 90 (3 episodes)
 "Sizeman and Son" (1956) - Marie Sizeman
 "Three Men on a Horse" (1957) - Audrey Trowbridge
 "The Long March" (1958) - Betsy
 The DuPont Show with June Allyson
 "The Pledge" (1959) - Sandra McAllen
 Maverick (2 episodes)
 "The Cats Of Paradise" (1959) - Modesty Blaine
 "The Cruise of the Cynthia B" (1960) - Modesty Blaine
 Johnny Ringo
 "Mrs. Ringo" (1960) - Marilyn Barber
 United States Steel Hour
 "The Two Worlds of Charlie Gordon" (1961)
 Perry Mason (3 episodes)
 "The Case of the Lurid Letter" (1962) - Jane Wardman
 "The Case of the Illicit Illusion" (1964) - Rosanne Ambrose
 "The Case of the 12th Wildcat" (1965) - Ellen Payne

References

External links

 
 Mona Freeman; Aveleyman.com
 

1926 births
2014 deaths
American film actresses
American television actresses
American portrait painters
American women painters
Actresses from New York (state)
Artists from New York (state)
Painters from New York (state)
Paramount Pictures contract players
20th-century American actresses
20th-century American painters
20th-century American women artists
Burials at Forest Lawn Memorial Park (Hollywood Hills)
21st-century American women